The GMA T.33 or Gordon Murray Automotive Type 33 is a sports car manufactured by Gordon Murray Automotive. Designed by Gordon Murray, the T.33 is the manufacturer's second model after the T.50 supercar.

Design
The design of the GMA T.33 is claimed to be inspired by grand tourers of the 1960s, such as the Ferrari Dino and Lamborghini Miura. Murray utilized a 2-seater coupé configuration for the T.33, with the body built entirely in carbon fibre and mounted on a carbon fibre-and-aluminium frame.

Power is sent to the rear wheels via a standard 6-speed Xtrac manual transmission or an optional paddle-shifted 6-speed automatic transmission.

Production
GMA plans to build 100 customer cars at its Surrey production site.

References

External links

Sports cars
Cars introduced in 2022
Coupés
Rear mid-engine, rear-wheel-drive vehicles
Upcoming car models